Calosoma harrarensis is a species of ground beetle in the subfamily of Carabinae. It was described by Jacobson in 1900.

References

harrarensis
Beetles described in 1900